Marko Mäkinen (born March 31, 1977) is a Finnish professional ice hockey player currently with TPS Turku in the Finnish SM-liiga.

External links

References 

1977 births
Finnish ice hockey right wingers
San Jose Sharks draft picks
Espoo Blues players
Kentucky Thoroughblades players
Louisville RiverFrogs players
Indianapolis Ice players
Greenville Grrrowl players
Lukko players
HIFK (ice hockey) players
Tappara players
HC TPS players
HC TWK Innsbruck players
Living people
Sportspeople from Turku